Tuggali is a mandal in Kurnool district of Andhra Pradesh, India.Tuggali is a village of nearly 5000 population.

Geography
It has an average elevation of 469 meters (1541 feet).

References

Villages in Kurnool district